The Jordan women's national handball team is the national team of Jordan. It is governed by the Jordan Handball Federation and takes part in international handball competitions.

Records
 Champions   Runners-up   Third place   Fourth place

Asian Championship

West Asian Championship

External links

IHF profile

National team
Women's national handball teams
Handball